Akhtar Sarfraz (20 February 1976 – 10 June 2019) was a Pakistani cricket coach, international cricketer and selector for the Pakistan women's cricket team between 2018 and 2019.

He played four One Day Internationals (ODIs) between 1997 and 1998. His first-class career spanned 13 years, where he played in 118 matches, scoring 5,720 runs.

He died on 10 June 2019 at the age of 43 due to colon cancer. The left-handed batsman died at the Shaukat Khanum Memorial cancer hospital in Lahore.

References

External links
 

1976 births
2019 deaths
Pakistan One Day International cricketers
Cricketers at the 1998 Commonwealth Games
Pakistani cricketers
Peshawar cricketers
National Bank of Pakistan cricketers
Peshawar Panthers cricketers
Cricketers from Peshawar
Deaths from cancer in Pakistan
Commonwealth Games competitors for Pakistan
Deaths from colorectal cancer